PNU can stand for:

Education
Payame Noor University, Tehran, Iran headquarters and 500+ locations worldwide.
Pacific National University, Khabarovsk, Russia
Philippine Normal University, Manila, Philippine
Precarpathian National University, Ivano-Frankivsk, Ukraine
Princess of Naradhiwas University, Narathiwat, Thailand
Princess Nora bint Abdul Rahman University, Riyadh, Saudi Arabia
Pusan National University, Busan, Republic of Korea

Other uses
Party of National Unity (Kenya), a Kenyan political party
Penrith Nepean United, an association football club in New South Wales, Australia
Protein Nitrogen Unit, a measure of the potency of the compounds used in allergy skin tests